The 2011–12 season was Zob Ahan Football Club's 11th season in the Iran Pro League, and their 16th consecutive season in the top division of Iranian football. They also competed in the Hazfi Cup and AFC Champions League, and had their 42nd year in existence as a football club.

Player

First team squad
As of 2 August 2011.

Iran Pro League squad
As of 16 June 2011

 (Vice-Captain)

For recent transfers, see List of Iranian football transfers, summer 2011.

Transfers
Confirmed transfers 2011–12

Summer

In:

Out:

 

Competitions

Iran Pro League

 Standings 

 Results summary 

 Results by round 

Matches

AFC Champions League

 AFC Champions League 2011 

 Quarter-finals 

 AFC Champions League 2012 

 Qualifying play-off 

Hazfi Cup

 Matches 

 Round of 32 

 Last 16 

Friendly Matches

Statistics

 Appearances 

|}

Top scorers
Includes all competitive matches. The list is sorted by shirt number when total goals are equal.Last updated on 14 October 2011Friendlies and Pre season goals are not recognized as competitive match goals.Top assistors
Includes all competitive matches. The list is sorted by shirt number when total assistors are equal.Last updated on 14 October 2011Friendlies and Pre season goals are not recognized as competitive match assist.Disciplinary record
Includes all competitive matches. Players with 1 card or more included only.Last updated on 14 October 2011''

Goals conceded 
 Updated on 14 October 2011

Own goals 
 Updated on 14 October 2011

Club

Coaching staff

Other information

See also

2011–12 Persian Gulf Cup
2011–12 Hazfi Cup
2011 AFC Champions League
2012 AFC Champions League

References

External links
Iran Premier League Statistics
Persian League

2011–12
Iranian football clubs 2011–12 season